The 2007–08 Montenegrin First League was the second season of the top-tier football in Montenegro, since the vote for Montenegrin independence split the Montenegrin FA from Serbia's. FK Jedinstvo and FK Berane were relegated to the second league, giving FK Bokelj their first time in the top league of Montenegro. The 2007-08 season began on 11 August 2007 and ended on 24 May 2008.

Teams
FK Berane were directly relegated to the Montenegrin Second League after finishing 12th in last year's standings. Their place was taken by Second League champions Lovćen Cetinje.

10th placed Dečić Tuzi and 11th placed Jedinstvo Bijelo Polje had to compete in two-legged relegation play-offs. Jedinstvo were relegated by losing 4–2 on aggregate against the 2nd placed team from Second League, Bokelj Kotor. On the other hand, Dečić saved their place in Montenegrin top league by beating cross-town rivals Ibar Rožaje, who had finished in 3rd place in the Second League, with a 3–2 on aggregate.

Stadia and locations

League table

Results
The schedule consists of three rounds. During the first two rounds, each team played each other once home and away for a total of 22 matches. The pairings of the third round will then be set according to the standings after the first two rounds, giving every team a third game against each opponent for a total of 33 games per team.

First and second round

Third round
Key numbers for pairing determination (number marks position after 22 games):

Relegation play-offs
The 10th placed team (against the 3rd placed team of the Second League) and the 11th placed team (against the 2nd placed team of the Second League) will both compete in two-legged relegation play-offs after the end of the season.

Summary

Matches

Sutjeska won 1–0 on aggregate.

Jedinstvo won 3–0 on aggregate.

Top scorers

Notes

References

Montenegrin First League seasons
Monte
1